North Korea flooding may refer to:
 Floods during the North Korean famine (1994-1998)
 2006 North Korean floods
 2007 North Korean floods
 2012 North Korean floods
 2016 North Korean floods
 2018 North Korean floods
 2020 Korean floods